Pro-life movements are those which advocate against the practice of abortion and its legality.

Pro-life may also refer to:

Ideologies and social movements
 Right to life, an ideology encompassing views on abortion, capital punishment, and euthanasia
 United States anti-abortion movement, a U.S. social movement opposed to elective abortion
 Anti-abortion feminism, a philosophy of opposition to abortion based on feminism
 Opposition to the death penalty
 Opposition to the death penalty in the United States
 Opposition to euthanasia
 Opposition to assisted suicide
 Pro-life, opposition to embryonic stem cell destruction; see stem cell controversy

Organisations
 ProLife Alliance, a UK political party
 Pro-Life Alliance of Gays and Lesbians, an American interest group

Other uses
 Pro-life (term), the history of the term itself, particularly as applied to the abortion debate
 Pro-Life (politician), the legal name of an Idaho political candidate formerly known as Marvin Richardson
 "Pro-Life" (Masters of Horror), a 2006 episode of Masters of Horror, set in an abortion clinic

See also
 Culture of life, a broad philosophical opposition to practices destructive of human life, often including abortion, euthanasia, assisted suicide, and capital punishment, among others
 Eighth Amendment of the Constitution of Ireland, also known as the Pro-Life Amendment